Simon Anthony Hart (born 15 August 1963) is a British politician serving as the Chief Whip of the House of Commons and Parliamentary Secretary to the Treasury since October 2022. He previously served as Secretary of State for Wales between 2019 and 2022. A member of the Conservative Party, he was first elected in the 2010 general election as the Member of Parliament (MP) for Carmarthen West and South Pembrokeshire, defeating the previous Labour MP Nick Ainger who had represented the constituency and its predecessor since 1992. He was reelected in 2015, 2017 and 2019 general elections.

He resigned as Secretary of State for Wales after writing a letter to Prime Minister Boris Johnson on 6 July 2022.

Early life 
Hart was born in Wolverhampton on 15 August 1963 and grew up in the Cotswolds. He was privately educated at Radley College before attending the Royal Agricultural College in Cirencester. He worked as a chartered surveyor in Carmarthen and Haverfordwest and served with the Territorial Army for five years in the Royal Gloucestershire Hussars (part of the Royal Wessex Yeomanry).

Hart was Master and Huntsman of the South Pembrokeshire Hunt from 1988 to 1999. He was director of the Campaign for Hunting (ie fox hunting) from 1999 to 2003. He was the chief executive of the Countryside Alliance from 2003 to 2010, and later its chairman from 2015 to 2019.

Political career 
He has been the MP for Carmarthen West and South Pembrokeshire since the 2010 general election. He was re-elected at the 2015 general election and 2017 general election. In the 2019 general election, Hart more than doubled his previous majority of 3,110 to 7,745. He secured 52.7% of the vote, up 5.9 percentage points compared to 2017.

In 2017 Hart faced questions over breaches of the code of conduct and was being investigated over an alleged breach of paragraph 15.

In August 2018, Hart accused actress Maxine Peake of hypocrisy, for 'taking money from the NHS for work on an advertisement, whilst attacking the Government for lack of investment in the NHS'. Peake responded that the fee came from an advertising agency and would not have gone back to the NHS if she had returned it, and she had donated the fee to The Salford Foundation Trust children's charity regardless.
 
On 27 July 2019, in Boris Johnson's administration, he was promoted to Parliamentary Secretary at the Cabinet Office, with responsibility for policy implementation. He replaced fellow Conservative  Oliver Dowden and stood down as Chairman of the Countryside Alliance.

In October 2019 it was reported that Hart was the Welsh MP with the highest expense claims for first-class rail tickets. Official guidance from the Independent Parliamentary Standards Authority states politicians should "consider value for money" when booking tickets; however, first-class rail travel is still permissible within the expenses rules.

In the run-up to the 2019 general election, Hart shared an image of a campaign placard which had been defaced during the 2017 general election. Referencing the levels of "abuse … vitriol and intimidation" to which candidates had been subjected in 2017, Hart used a Facebook post to call for high standards of conduct among candidates, a subject on which he says he has worked to find cross-party solutions since the 2017 election. However, during the 2019 election campaign, the same sign was shown to have two swastikas newly added, putting Hart under suspicion. Shadow secretary of state for Wales, Christina Rees, asked Hart "did you deface your own signs with swastikas for personal electoral gain? If not, explain how they came to be there. Because right now there appears to be no other rational explanation."

Hart has served on the Political and Constitutional Reform Select Committee, Welsh Affairs Select Committee, Environment, Food and Rural Affairs Select Committee, Digital, Culture, Media and Sport Committee, Commons Select Committee on Standards and Commons Select Committee of Privileges.

Welsh Secretary 
Following the 2019 general election, Hart was appointed Secretary of State for Wales by Prime Minister Boris Johnson, replacing Alun Cairns.

On 22 April 2020, during the COVID-19 pandemic, he became the first minister to speak in the Commons chamber via remote video link, answering a question from Marco Longhi, the Conservative MP for Dudley North, who also spoke remotely.

On 6 July 2022, Hart resigned from government in the wake of widespread criticism of Boris Johnson's handling of the Chris Pincher scandal, following the earlier resignations of Chancellor Rishi Sunak and Health Secretary Sajid Javid.

Chief Whip
Hart was appointed Chief Whip of the Conservative Party as part of the Sunak ministry on 25 October 2022.

Personal life
Hart lives near Narberth in Pembrokeshire with his wife Abigail and their two children. He employs his wife as his office manager.

References

External links
Simon Hart MP official constituency website
Simon Hart MP Conservative Party profile
Simon Hart MP Welsh Conservative Party profile
Carmarthen West & South Pembrokeshire Conservatives

Profile at the Countryside Alliance
Official channel at YouTube

|-

|-

|-

1963 births
Living people
Alumni of the Royal Agricultural University
Members of the Parliament of the United Kingdom for Carmarthenshire constituencies
Members of the Parliament of the United Kingdom for Pembrokeshire constituencies
Conservative Party (UK) MPs for Welsh constituencies
People educated at Radley College
UK MPs 2010–2015
UK MPs 2015–2017
UK MPs 2017–2019
UK MPs 2019–present
Secretaries of State for Wales
Members of the Privy Council of the United Kingdom
Member of the Committee on Standards in Public Life